In algebraic geometry, given algebraic stacks  over a base category C, a morphism  of algebraic stacks is a functor such that .

More generally, one can also consider a morphism between prestacks; (a stackification would be an example.)

Types 
One particular important example is a presentation of a stack, which is widely used in the study of stacks.

An algebraic stack X is said to be smooth of dimension n - j if there is a smooth presentation  of relative dimension j for some smooth scheme U of dimension n.

A quasi-affine morphism between algebraic stacks is a morphism that factorizes as a quasi-compact open immersion followed by an affine morphism.

Notes

References 
Stacks Project, Ch, 83, Morphisms of algebraic stacks

Algebraic geometry